Since his election in 2013, Pope Francis has authorized the beatification of 1,483 people, including one equipollent beatification. The names listed below are from the Holy See website and are listed by year, then date. The locations given are the locations of the beatification ceremonies, not necessarily the birthplaces or homelands of the beatified.

2013

2014

2015

2016

2017

2018

2019

2020

2021

2022

Upcoming Beatifications

2023
 22 April 2023, Paris, France
 Henri Planchat & 4 Companions
 6 May 2023, Granada, Spain
 Maria Concepción Barrecheguren García
 6 May 2023, Montevideo, Uruguay
 Jacinto Vera
 10 September 2023, Markowa, Poland
Józef Ulma & 8 Companions

No definite date
 Petro Oros
 Fulton J. Sheen
 Elisabetta Martinez

See also
 List of people beatified by Pope Pius X
 List of people beatified by Pope Benedict XV
 List of people beatified by Pope Pius XI
 List of people beatified by Pope Pius XII
 List of people beatified by Pope John XXIII
 List of people beatified by Pope Paul VI
 List of people beatified by Pope John Paul II
 List of people beatified by Pope Benedict XVI

Notes

 Later canonized on 16 October 2016.
 Later canonized on 14 October 2018.
 Later canonized on 15 May 2022.

References

People beatified by Pope Francis
People beatified by Pope Francis
 
Francis